Michael Nolin is an American former motion picture producer, former studio executive and former writer/director.

Production credits
His producing credits include Mr. Holland's Opus, which won a Christopher Award and for which Richard Dreyfuss was nominated for an Academy Award; Full Body Massage for director Nicolas Roeg; and the Independent Spirit Award-nominated 84 Charlie Mopic for writer/director Patrick Sheane Duncan. He wrote and directed Wildly Available, which was runner-up for a Discovery Award at the Hollywood Film Festival, and co-wrote the teleplay for Maniac Magee, which was nominated for a Humanitas Prize.

References

External links

Film and Television Faculty at Savannah College of Art and Design
1997 Discovery Award winners at Hollywood Film Festival

Living people
American film producers
American film directors
American male screenwriters
American film studio executives
USC School of Cinematic Arts alumni
Savannah College of Art and Design faculty
University at Albany, SUNY alumni
1950 births
Screenwriters from Georgia (U.S. state)